The Democratic Front for the Liberation of Palestine (DFLP; , al-Jabha al-Dīmūqrāṭiyya li-Taḥrīr Filasṭīn) is a secular Palestinian Marxist–Leninist organization. It is also frequently referred to as the Democratic Front, or al-Jabha al-Dīmūqrāṭiyya. It is a member organization of the Palestine Liberation Organization, the Alliance of Palestinian Forces and the Democratic Alliance List.

The group maintains a paramilitary wing called the National Resistance Brigades. One of the attacks for which the DFLP is best known is the 1974 Ma'alot massacre in which 25 schoolchildren and teachers were killed. Although the National Resistance Brigades have fighters based in both the West Bank and the Gaza Strip, these fighters have been engaged in relatively few military operations since the Al-Aqsa Intifada. The National Resistance Brigades continue to take part in training exercises at paramilitary camps near Rafah and Khan Yunis.

History

Formation as the PDFLP

The Popular Front for the Liberation of Palestine (PFLP) was formed in 1967 by George Habash as a left-wing organization. The PFLP split in 1968, leading to the formation of the Popular Democratic Front for the Liberation of Palestine (PDFLP) headed by Secretary-General Nayef Hawatmeh, who had been referred to as a leader of the PFLP's Maoist tendency. He believed that under George Habash the PFLP had become too focused on military matters, and wanted to make the PDFLP a more grassroots and ideologically focused organization. Another split in the PFLP in 1968 led to the formation by Ahmad Jibril of the Popular Front for the Liberation of Palestine – General Command (PFLP-GC), to focus more on the tactical implementation of armed struggle.

In May–June 1969, the Palestinian Revolutionary Left League and the Palestine Popular Liberation Organization merged into PDFLP.

The PDFLP soon gained a reputation as the most intellectual of the Palestinian fedayeen groups, and drew heavily on Marxist–Leninist theory to explain the situation in the Middle East. Its other leaders included Yasser Abed Rabbo.

Early years and ideological moderation 
The DFLP declared that its goal was to "create a people's democratic Palestine, where Arabs and Jews would live without discrimination, a state without classes and national oppression, a state which allows Arabs and Jews to develop their national culture."

The PDFLP's original political orientation was based on the view that Palestinian national goals could be achieved only through revolution of the masses and "people's war". However, it would soon come around to a more moderate standpoint and while preserving a hard-line attitude to armed struggle, the party began theorizing on various compromise solutions.

DFLP was badly hit by the 1970 September crack-down in Jordan. The offices of its Amman-based publication Al-Charar was bombed and burned by Jordanian tanks.

From the mid-1970s, the group occupied a political stance midway between Yasser Arafat and the PLO hardliners. The DFLP condemned attacks outside Israel (such as the aircraft hijackings for which the Habash PFLP gained notoriety) and was essential in making the binational state the goal of the PLO in the 1970s, insisting on the need for cooperation between Arabs and Jews. Still, while pioneering Palestinian-Israeli peace talks through making early contact with Jewish and Israeli peace campaigners, including Matzpen, the DFLP simultaneously conducted numerous small bombings and minor assaults against Israeli targets, refusing to give up the armed struggle. The Ma'alot massacre of 1974, an attack on Israeli school in which 27 people were killed, was the group's largest attack.

Between Fatah and the Rejectionists 
In 1974, the PDFLP changed its name to the Democratic Front for the Liberation of Palestine (DFLP). It was also a strong supporter of the 1974 Ten Point Program, which was accepted by the Palestinian National Council (PNC) after lobbying by Fatah and DFLP, and which cautiously introduced the concept of a two-state solution in the PLO, and led to a split in the organization leading to the formation of the Rejectionist Front, where radical organizations such as the PFLP, PFLP-GC, Palestine Liberation Front and others gathered with the backing of Syria, Libya and Iraq to oppose Arafat and the mainstream PLO stance.

In 1974 the DFLP perpetrated a major terror attack in Israel, when attacking a local elementary school in the village of Ma'alot. Taking the school-children as hostages, 22 children aged 14–16 were killed when an army commando engaged them.

In 1978 the DFLP temporarily switched sides and joined the Rejectionist Front after clashing with Arafat on several issues, but it would continue to serve as a mediator in the factional disputes of the PLO. In the tense situation leading up to the 1983 Fatah rebellion, during the Lebanese Civil War, the DFLP offered mediation to prevent the Syrian-backed formation of a rival Fatah leadership under Said al-Muragha (Abu Musa), the Fatah al-Intifada faction. Its efforts ultimately failed, and the PLO became embroiled in what was in effect a Palestinian civil war.

Stagnation in the 1980s 
From the early 1980s the DFLP was seen as the most pro-Soviet and pro-Chinese of the PLO member organisations. The collapse of the Soviet Union and the growing Islamist trend in Palestinian society during the 1990s sapped the party of much of its popularity and resources. The Chinese leader Deng Xiaoping also began to reduce the PRC's support for revolutionary struggles abroad throughout this period so as to reduce the damage it caused to trade relations with the West. The DFLP continued to cautiously support Arafat's attempts to open negotiations with Israel, but this was not uncontroversial within the membership.

The First Intifada (1987–93) provoked a shift in Palestinian politics towards the West Bank and Gaza Strip, which proved a severe handicap for the largely diaspora-based DFLP. With the swift rise of Islamism and religious groups such as Hamas in the 1980s, the DFLP faded among the Palestinian youth, and internal confusion over the future path of the organization paralysed political decision-making.

On 23 February 1989 three members of the DFLP were killed by the SLA inside the Israel’s security zone in South Lebanon. The killings brought the number of guerrillas killed in South Lebanon since the beginning of 1989 to thirty.

1991 split 
In 1991 the DFLP split, with a minority faction led by Yasser Abd Rabbo (who had become increasingly close to Yasser Arafat) favouring the Madrid negotiations that led initially to limited Palestinian autonomy in the West Bank and Gaza Strip. Inspired by the USSR's Glasnost and the fall of the Berlin Wall, this group also favored a new political orientation, focused less on Marxism and armed struggle, and more on the democratisation of Palestinian society. It reconstituted itself as the Palestine Democratic Union (FIDA), and Abed Rabbo was officially made an advisor of Arafat.

There were reports of armed clashes between the factions in Syria during the split. Essentially the Damascus-headquartered DFLP under Nayef Hawatmeh was able to retain its external branches, whereas the majority of the organization within Palestine, mainly on the West Bank, was taken over by FIDA.

The Oslo period 
The DFLP, under Hawatmeh, joined the rejectionist groups to form the Alliance of Palestinian Forces (APF) to oppose the Declaration of Principles signed in 1993. The group argued that the Oslo negotiations were undemocratic, excluded the PLO from decision-making and deprived the Palestinians of their legitimate rights, but in contrast to most other Alliance members they did not oppose a two-state solution as such. Along with the PFLP, it then broke from the APF over ideological differences, and has made limited moves toward merging with the PFLP since the mid-1990s.

In 1999, at a meeting in Cairo, the DFLP and the PFLP agreed to cooperate with the PLO leadership in final status negotiations with Israel. In October 1999, the group was dropped from the United States' list of terror organizations. The DFLP was subsequently represented in the Palestinian delegation at the unsuccessful Camp David negotiations of July 2000.

Second Intifada (2000–2005) 
The DFLP has been largely unable to make its presence felt during the al-Aqsa Intifada, which began in 2000. The leadership is stationed in Damascus, and most of the DFLP organization on the Occupied Territories unraveled in the FIDA split. Its military capacity has been fading fast since the 1993 cease-fire between the PLO and Israel, which the DFLP respected despite its objections to the Oslo Accords.

Since the beginning of the Second Palestinian Intifada the DFLP has carried out a number of shooting attacks against Israeli targets, such as the 25 August 2001 attack on a military base in Gaza that killed three Israeli soldiers and wounded seven others. However, its military capabilities in the Occupied Territories remain limited, and the refocusing on armed struggle during the Intifada has further weakened the organization.

On 11 September 2001, an anonymous caller claimed responsibility for the September 11 attacks in the United States on behalf of the DFLP. This was immediately denied by Nayef Hawatmeh, who strongly condemned the attacks. Although the accusations gained some attention in the days following the attacks, they are now universally regarded as false.

Political influence 

The DFLP ran a candidate, Taysir Khalid, in the Palestinian Authority presidential election in 2005. He gained 3.35% of the vote. The party had initially participated in discussions with the PFLP and the Palestinian People's Party on running a joint left-wing candidate, but these were unsuccessful. It won one seat in the 2005 PA municipal elections.

In the 2006 elections to the Palestinian Legislative Council, the Front formed a joint list called al-Badeel (The Alternative) with Palestine Democratic Union (FIDA), the Palestinian People's Party and independents. The list was led by the historic DFLP leader Qais Abd al-Karim (Abu Leila). It received 2.8% of the popular vote and won two of the Council's 132 seats.

The DFLP retains important influence within the Palestine Liberation Organization (PLO). It was traditionally the third-largest group within the PLO, after Fatah and the PFLP, and since no new elections have been held to the PNC or the Executive Committee since 1988, the DFLP still commands important sectors within the organization. The PLO's role has admittedly diminished in later years, in favor of the Palestinian National Authority (PNA), but it is still the recognized representative of the Palestinian people, and a reactivation of the PLO's constitutional supremacy over the PNA in connection with power struggles in Palestinian society is a distinct possibility.

Organization and leadership 
The DFLP held its 5th national general congress during a time-span from February to August 2007. The congress was divided into three parallel circle: West Bank, Gaza strip and the Palestinian exiles. The congress elected a Central Committee, with 81 full members and 21 alternate members.

Subsequently, after the closure of the 5th national general congress, the Central Committee re-elected Hawatmeh as Secretary-General of the DFLP. The Central Committee also elected a 13-member political bureau, including:

Support base 
The DFLP is primarily active among Palestinians in Syria and Lebanon, with a smaller presence in the West Bank and Gaza Strip. Its Jordan branch has been converted into a separate political party, the Jordanian Democratic People's Party (JDPP or Hashd), and the DFLP is no longer active on the political arena there.

The DFLP mainly attracts Palestinians with a more socially liberal and secular lifestyle, as well as Palestinian Christians, primarily in cities like Nablus, and Bethlehem.

The party publishes a weekly newspaper in several Arab countries, al-Hurriya (Liberty).

External relations 
The DFLP is believed to receive limited financial and military aid from Syria, where it is active in the Palestinian refugee camps. The DFLP's leader, Nayif Hawatmeh lives in Syria. It has provided with military training other Marxist–Leninist militants of the Kurdistan Workers' Party (PKK) and the Sandinistas.   

The DFLP is not listed as a terrorist organization by the United States government or the United Nations. It was dropped from the U.S. State Department list of Foreign Terrorist Organizations in 1999, "primarily because of the absence of terrorist activity, as defined by relevant law...during the past two years."

See also 
 Palestinian Communist Party
 Popular Front for the Liberation of Palestine
 Revolutionary People's Liberation Party/Front
 Syrian Resistance
 List of political parties in the State of Palestine

References 

Bibliography
 Patterns of Global Terrorism, 1998. United States Department of State, April 1999.

External links
Democratic Front for the Liberation of Palestine – Official English language web page.
 – Old website
Al-badeel electoral coalition
al-Hourriah Magazine (Arabic language)
al-Ahali – Newspaper of the Jordanian JDPP (Arabic language)
 – General info

 
Anti-Zionism in the Palestinian territories
Guerrilla organizations
Marxist parties in Palestine
Maoist parties
National liberation movements
Organizations formerly designated as terrorist by the United States
Palestinian militant groups
Axis of Resistance